Secret Ceremonies: A Mormon Woman's Intimate Diary of Marriage and Beyond is a 1993 autobiographical book written by American journalist and columnist Deborah Laake.

Description
Laake, a former member of the Church of Jesus Christ of Latter-day Saints (LDS Church), chronicles her experiences with Mormonism and the various rituals performed in their temples. Laake recounts her studies at Brigham Young University, her loveless first marriage at nineteen, her subsequent divorce and the problems she encountered with the Mormon authorities and her relatives due to her practice of masturbation. The book was particularly noted for its revelation of the details of the Mormon temple rituals of Endowment and Celestial marriage. In the book, Laake claims that the pressures and sexual repression exerted by the church caused her to be ostracized and eventually hospitalized in a mental institution.

In 1994, a second edition of the book was published with additional information.

Critical reception
Secret Ceremonies was generally well received by critics. Kirkus Reviews called it, "A candid, often startling memoir of the author's life as a Mormon wife .... By no means objective, then, but, still, an affectingly personal look into the well-guarded citadel of Mormondom."

In terms of sales, the book was a commercial success, it spent fifteen weeks on the New York Times best-seller list. As of May 1994, over 500,000 copies were printed and the book was published in England, Germany and Bulgaria.

Shortly after the book's publication, Laake was excommunicated by the LDS Church for apostasy. Laake also stated that she was called a "liar" and received opposition from Mormon authorities.

References

1993 non-fiction books
Books critical of Mormonism
Latter Day Saint temple practices
1993 in Christianity